Rupert Moser (born 2 June 1944 in Horn, Thurgau canton, Switzerland) is professor emeritus for social anthropology and African studies at the University of Bern.  He conducted research on the paternal Ngoni (WaNgnoni) and the matrilineal Mwera in southern Tanzania. He did further work on the genesis of Swahili, migration and religious movements.

External links 
 Prof. Dr. Rupert Moser, University Bern
 Rupert Mosers Homepage

Academic staff of the University of Bern
Swiss anthropologists
Social anthropologists
1944 births
Living people
People from Thurgau